Finsta is a locality situated in Norrtälje Municipality, Stockholm County, Sweden with 244 inhabitants in 2010.

Finsta is according to local tradition the birthplace of Saint Bridget, one of Sweden's best known saints and the founder of the Bridgettine Order of nuns. Her father was the lawspeaker of Uppland and a local landowner; however other birthplaces have also been suggested.

See also 
Finstaatten

References 

Populated places in Norrtälje Municipality